The Romania women national rugby sevens team has yet to compete in the World Rugby Sevens Series, Rugby World Cup Sevens and Summer Olympic Games. They are currently competing in the Rugby Europe Sevens Women`s Championship Series.

Tournament history

Summer Olympics

Rugby World Cup Sevens

Recent Results

2018 European Women`s Sevens Trophy

Dnipro

Pool C

Knockout stage

Cup

Szeged

Pool C

Knockout stage

Cup
{{Round8-with third

|8 July 2018 – 10:00
||57||5
|8 July 2018 – 11:06
||5||20
|8 July 2018 – 10:22
||31||5
|8 July 2018 – 10:44
|''|36||0

|8 July 2018 – 13:59
||24||7
|8 July 2018 – 14:21
||50||5

|8 July 2018 – 17:11
||19||12

|8 July 2018 – 16:49
||19||7
}}

Standings

2019 Rugby Europe Women's Sevens TrophyBudapestPool CKnockout stageCupLisbonPool BKnockout stageCup

Standings 

2019 Rugby Europe Women's Sevens Olympic Qualifying Tournament

Pool CKnockout stage'''

Cup

Plate

Players

Current squad
The following 12 players were called up for the 2021 Rugby Europe Women Sevens Championship Series on the 21st of June 2021.

<noinclude>

Coaches

Current coaching staff
The current coaching staff of the Romanian women national sevens team:

See also
Rugby union in Romania
Romania national rugby union team
Romania national rugby sevens team
Romania national under-20 rugby union team

External links
 Official website 
 PlanetaOvala.ro/ Romanian rugby news

References

Rugby union in Romania
R
Women's national rugby sevens teams